José Mariano Rebelo Pires Gago, ComSE (16 May, 1948 – 17 April, 2015), commonly referred to as Mariano Gago, was a Portuguese physicist and politician, mostly known for his tenures as Minister for Science and Higher Education. He held government offices for a total of 13 years, more than any other person since 1976. 

He graduated as an electrical engineer by the University of Lisbon's Instituto Superior Técnico in Lisbon, and did advanced research work in Paris at the École Polytechnique as a high-energy physicist. Professor of Physics at Instituto Superior Técnico in Lisbon, he worked at CERN (European Organization for Nuclear Research) in Geneva for several years. He was a member of the CERN Council (1985–1990), the EC Joint Research Centre Board of Governors (1986–1989), President of the Portuguese National Board for Science and Technology (1986–1989), and was chair of the European EUREKA initiative from July 1997 to June 1998. Prof. Gago was the Minister for Science and Technology of Portugal since 1995, and represented Portugal at the Council of Ministers for Research and Development of the European Union. He was also responsible for the coordination of the Portuguese policy on Information Society, and for the promotion of science education and scientific culture.

Throughout his career, Prof. Gago emphasised the link between teaching and research, and addressed issues such as whether universities should specialise more in teaching or in research and whether there were possible divergences between teaching and research priorities, although never managing to reach acceptable educational levels within some Portuguese higher education institutions. Prof. Gago was the founder of the Ciência Viva programme (since 1996), which on behalf of the Ministry of Science and Technology, aims to promote scientific and technological culture among the Portuguese population. "My generation's legacy will be that research and technology made great progress in being more accessible and understandable to the public. The present development of technical advancement would have been unthinkable if we were unable to rely on the basic technical knowledge of the average citizen," stated Prof. Gago.

He also fostered research that is increasingly carried out in a framework of international cooperation, as a chance for Portugal to develop new products and provide new types of knowledge-intensive services.

During his tenure as Minister for Science, Technology and Higher Education of the XVII Governo Constitucional, Mariano Gago's Ministry was responsible for the compulsory closing of problematic and unreliable private higher education institutions (Independente University and Moderna University).

Career as minister in the Government of Portugal
From 2005-03-12 to 2011-06-21:
Minister for Science, Technology and Higher Education of Portugal of the XVII Governo Constitucional (Prime Minister José Sócrates)
From 1999-10-25 to 2002-04-06:
Minister for Science and Technology of Portugal of the XIV Governo Constitucional (Prime Minister António Guterres)
From 1995-10-28 to 1999-10-25:
Minister for Science and Technology of Portugal of the XIII Governo Constitucional (Prime Minister António Guterres)

External links
Biography on Portugal.gov.pt
Scientific publications of Mariano Gag on INSPIRE-HEP

1948 births
2015 deaths
People associated with CERN
Socialist Party (Portugal) politicians
Education ministers of Portugal
Instituto Superior Técnico alumni
Members of Academia Europaea
Portuguese physicists